Kim Jae-youn (born 26 August 1996) is a South Korean swimmer. He competed in the men's 100 metre breaststroke event at the 2017 World Aquatics Championships.

References

External links
 

1996 births
Living people
South Korean male breaststroke swimmers
Place of birth missing (living people)
Swimmers at the 2018 Asian Games
Asian Games bronze medalists for South Korea
Medalists at the 2018 Asian Games
Asian Games medalists in swimming
21st-century South Korean people